Connor Wyatt Trinneer (born March 19, 1969) is an American film, stage, and television actor. He is best known for his roles as Charles "Trip" Tucker III on Star Trek: Enterprise, Michael on the series Stargate Atlantis, and Professor Moynihan on the web series Guilty Party Japan.

Early life
Trinneer was born on March 19, 1969, in Walla Walla, Washington, but spent many years in Kelso, Washington, where he attended elementary and middle schools, and then Kelso High School. He attended Pacific Lutheran University in Parkland where he played college football. He graduated with a Bachelor of Fine Arts degree in acting, then obtained a Master of Fine Arts degree from University of Missouri-Kansas City.

Career

Trinneer first came to attention in Arcadia at the Huntington Theater Company in Boston. Much of his work has been in theater, specifically a long association with the Circle X Theatre Company in Hollywood.

He has had several guest-starring roles on television, including One Life to Live, Sliders, and Touched by an Angel. He also had a significant role in the TV adaptation of A.R. Gurney's Far East, playing the conflicted gay officer Bob Munger.

In 2001, Trinneer auditioned for Star Trek: Enterprise. At the time, he did not follow science fiction and was unaware of the franchise's significance. He said that he gained the role of Tucker through sheer luck, as he anticipated that more than a hundred actors would audition for the part. During the audition, he had only seven script pages on which to base his performance, and was told only that the character originated from the southern United States.

After the cancellation of Enterprise, Trinneer returned to guest-star roles on series such as Terminator: The Sarah Connor Chronicles, 24 and a recurring role as the Wraith Michael in Stargate Atlantis.

Trinneer attended the GO3 Electronic and Entertainment Expo in Perth, Western Australia, and appeared with fellow Stargate Atlantis co-star David Nykl on the 2009 Channel Seven Perth Telethon.

Personal life
Trinneer married Ariana Navarre on May 29, 2004; they have a son, born on October 11, 2005.  In 2022, during the broadcast of the webcast "The Shuttlepod Show", Trinneer revealed he had divorced his wife that year.

Filmography

Film

Television

Video games

References

External links

 
 Connor Trinneer on Twitter

1969 births
20th-century American male actors
21st-century American male actors
American male film actors
American male soap opera actors
American male stage actors
American male television actors
Living people
Male actors from Washington (state)
Pacific Lutheran Lutes football players
Pacific Lutheran University alumni
People from Kelso, Washington
People from Walla Walla, Washington
University of Missouri–Kansas City alumni